The BBCH-scale (strawberry) identifies the phenological development stages of strawberry (Fragaria ananassa).  It is a plant species specific version of the BBCH-scale.

1 Normally after the three leaf stage the bud development occurs in principal growth stage 5.

References

 Meier, U., Bleiholder, H., Buhr, L., Feller, C., Hack, H., Heß, M., ... & Weber, E. (2009). The BBCH system to coding the phenological growth stages of plants–history and publications. Journal für Kulturpflanzen, 61(2), 41-52.

External links
A downloadable version of the BBCH Scales

BBCH-scale